The Chizhou–Huangshan high-speed railway is a high-speed railway line in Anhui, China. It is expected to open in 2023.

References

High-speed railway lines in China
High-speed railway lines under construction